The 2009 IPC Swimming European Championships was an international swimming competition. It was held in Reykjavik, Iceland and ran from 18 to 24 October. Around 650 athletes from 37 different countries attended. Great Britain finished top of the medal tables with 39 golds and 94 medals, both greater than any other country.

The 2009 Championships was the first IPC-run event where intellectual disability athletes were allowed to compete since the 2000 Summer Paralympic controversy. In the 2000 Sydney Games cheating by the Spanish basketball team resulted in the banning of all events for athletes with intellectual disabilities.

Venue

The Championship was staged at the Laugardalslaug located in the north of Reykjavik.

Events

Classification
Athletes are allocated a classification for each event based upon their disability to allow fairer competition between athletes of similar ability. The classifications for swimming are:
Visual impairment
S11-S13
Intellectual impairment
S14
Other disability
S1-S10 (Freestyle, backstroke and butterfly)
SB1-SB9 (breaststroke)
SM1-SM10 (individual medley)
Classifications run from S1 (severely disabled) to S10 (minimally disabled) for athletes with physical disabilities, and S11 (totally blind) to S13 (legally blind) for visually impaired athletes. Blind athletes must use blackened goggles.

Schedule

Medal table 
Great Britain led the 2009 Championships in both medals won and number of gold medals.

Multiple medallists

Participating nations
Below is the list of countries who agreed to participate in the Championships and the requested number of athlete places for each.

Footnotes
Notes

References

External links
 Official web-site

 
International sports competitions hosted by Iceland
World Para Swimming European Championships
Swimming in Iceland
IPC Swimming European Championships
IPC Swimming European Championships
Sports competitions in Reykjavík
October 2009 sports events in Europe
2000s in Reykjavík